Zhao Shuhao (born 18 January 1998) is a Chinese footballer currently playing as a defender for Wuhan Three Towns.

Club career
Born in Dancheng County, Henan, Zhao studied football in Brazil between 2012 and 2015.

Career statistics

Club
.

Notes

References

1998 births
Living people
Footballers from Henan
Chinese footballers
Association football defenders
China League Two players
China League One players
Wuhan Three Towns F.C. players
Chinese expatriate footballers
Chinese expatriate sportspeople in Brazil
Expatriate footballers in Brazil